Yocco's Hot Dogs is a regionally famous hot dog and cheesesteak establishment with four restaurants, each located in the Lehigh Valley region of eastern Pennsylvania.  Yocco's was founded in 1922 by Theodore Iacocca, uncle of Lee Iacocca.  Its corporate headquarters is located on East Minor Street in Emmaus.

History

Yocco's was originally established in 1922 at its former center city Allentown location at 625 Liberty Street. Its original name was the Liberty Grill.  From the 1970s to the 2000s, five new Yocco's restaurants were opened.  The first was opened at 2128 Hamilton Street in Allentown, followed by locations in Emmaus, Fogelsville, Trexlertown, and Hanover Township. The Liberty Street location closed in May 2016 and a sixth location at the South Mall in Salisbury Township opened in the fall of 2016. The company currently operates four locations in the Lehigh Valley, including two in Allentown, one in Fogelsville and one in Trexlertown.

Yocco's is currently run by Gary Iacocca, the third generation owner. The company's corporate headquarters is located in Emmaus.

The name Yocco's was derived from the name "Iacocca," after the family who owns the establishment.  However, because the Pennsylvania Dutch could not pronounce Iacocca (an Italian name) and said Yocco instead, the name was changed to reflect their pronunciation.

Locations
Yocco's West (2128 Hamilton Street, Allentown)
Yocco’s South (16 E Minor St, Emmaus, PA 18049)
Yocco's Route 100 (Interstate 78 and PA Route 100, Fogelsville)
Yocco's T-Town (7150 Hamilton Boulevard, Trexlertown)
Yocco's Valley Plaza (1930 Catasauqua Road, Allentown)
Yocco’s South Mall (3300 Lehigh St, Allentown)

Zippy the Pinhead
Yocco's has made several appearances in Zippy, a nationally syndicated comic strip featuring the character Zippy the Pinhead.

References

External links

Yocco's official site
Yocco's locations
Yocco's page at HollyEats.com

1922 establishments in Pennsylvania
Companies based in Lehigh County, Pennsylvania
Cuisine of the Mid-Atlantic states
Culture of Allentown, Pennsylvania
Emmaus, Pennsylvania
Hot dog restaurants in the United States
Restaurants established in 1922
Restaurants in Pennsylvania